Akritogyra similis is a species of sea snail, a marine gastropod mollusk, unassigned in the superfamily Seguenzioidea.

Description
The shell grows to a height of 2.2 mm.

Distribution
Akritogyra similis is found in European waters, specifically the North Atlantic Ocean and the Mediterranean Sea areas.

References

External links
  Serge GOFAS, Ángel A. LUQUE, Joan Daniel OLIVER,José TEMPLADO & Alberto SERRA (2021) - The Mollusca of Galicia Bank (NE Atlantic Ocean); European Journal of Taxonomy 785: 1–114
 

similis
Gastropods described in 1883